Senator Kirk may refer to:

United States Senate members
Mark Kirk (born 1959), U.S. Senator from Illinois from 2010 to 2017
Paul G. Kirk (born 1938), U.S. Senator from Massachusetts from 2009 to 2010

United States state senate members
Phil Kirk, North Carolina State Senate
Robert C. Kirk (1821–1898), Ohio State Senate